Frohburg is a town in the Leipzig district, in Saxony, Germany. It is situated 11 km northeast of Altenburg, and 34 km southeast of Leipzig. It includes the village of Flößberg and the town Kohren-Sahlis.

History 

Frohburg castle was first mentioned in documents at the end of the 10th century, the first documentary mention of the settlement itself dates from 1198, and in 1233 it is known as a town (oppidum), although it had no explicit town privileges and was directly ruled by the lord of the castle, which at this time was the burgrave of Altenburg. Town privileges were only awarded to Frohburg in 1831, and the first mayor elected three years later.

Until the mid-16th century, Frohburg was part of Pflege Altenburg, and from then on until 1856 of Amt Borna. From then on it was the centre of the judicial district (Gerichtsamt) Frohburg, until it passed to Amtshauptmannschaft (district) Borna.

Following a recession in the 19th century, the establishment of a calico printing mill in 1883 and the start of lignite mining north of the town helped economic recovery.

During World War II, a satellite camp of Buchenwald concentration camp was located just outside the village of Flößberg. The forced labour camp was a branch of the Leipzig-based arms manufacturer, Hugo Schneider AG (HASAG).

In 1960, the first motorcycle race on Frohburger Dreieck took place, and in 1962 the first motocross competition on the track Am Kaplanberg.

The neighbouring community of Streitwald was incorporated into the town in 1973, followed by Greifenhain in 1995, Benndorf in 1997, and Eschefeld, Frauendorf, Roda, Nenkersdorf and Schönau in 1999. On 1 January 2008 Frohburg and the community of Eulatal formed an administrative collectivity which ended a year later when Eulatal joined the community of Frohburg. The town of Kohren-Sahlis was incorporated into the town in 2018.

Geography and Transport

Geography 

Frohburg lies approximately halfway between Leipzig and Chemnitz, ca. 35 km south of Leipzig and 10 km south of Borna. The stream Wyhra flows through Frohburg.

Transport 

A south-north section of former B 95 connecting Chemnitz and Leipzig, now reclassified as state road S 51, runs through Frohburg. South of the town it intersects with B 7, running west from Rochlitz. The Neukieritzsch–Chemnitz railway, with trains between Leipzig and Geithain currently operated by Transdev, has a station in the town. The Frohburg junction of state road S 11 with A 72 is currently (2016) under construction.

Demographics
Total population figures from 31 December 2018: 12,699

Sons and daughters of the town

 Johannes Schmidt (1861-1926) German classical philologist and high school teacher.
 Otto Nuschke (1883-1957), politician and CDU - chairman in the Soviet occupation zone 
 Guntram Vesper (born 1941), writer, his novel Frohburg received the Preis der Leipziger Buchmesse in 2016
 Richard Schröder (born 1943), theologian and philosopher

Personalities who have worked on the ground

 Kunz von Kauffungen (1410-1455), Saxon nobleman, knight and military commander, lived from 1552 to 1555 in Wolftitz castle
 Hans Pfitzner (1869-1949), German composer, conductor and author of political and theoretical writings, honorary citizen of Frohburg
 Conrad Felixmüller (1897-1977), painter, lived in Tautenhain from 1944 to 1967 and created in 1951/52 the galleries for the church 
 Frauke Petry (born 1975), chemist, politician, AfD - chairman, lived in the district of Tautenhain

References 

Leipzig (district)